The Roman Catholic Diocese of Tibú is located in the city of Tibú in the ecclesiastical province of Nueva Pamplona in Colombia.

History
1 August 1951: Established as Territorial Prelature of Bertrania en el Catatumbo from the Diocese of Nueva Pamplona
16 November 1983: Renamed as Territorial Prelature of Tibú
29 December 1998: Promoted as Diocese of Tibú

Ordinaries, in reverse chronological order
 Bishops of Tibú (Latin Rite), below
 Israel Bravo Cortés (since 2021.11.05)
 Omar Alberto Sánchez Cubillos, O.P. (2011.06.08 – 2020.10.12), appointed Archbishop of Popayán
 Camilo Fernando Castrellón Pizano, S.D.B. (2001.04.23 – 2009.12.02), appointed Bishop of Barrancabermeja
 José de Jesús Quintero Díaz (1998.12.29 – 2000.10.23), appointed Vicar Apostolic of Leticia 
 Prelates of Tibú (Latin Rite), below
 José de Jesús Quintero Díaz (1996.01.05 – 1998.12.29)
 Luis Madrid Merlano (1988.05.21 – 1995.04.19), appointed Bishop of Cartago
 Horacio Olave Velandia (1988.01.21 – 1988.03.17)
 Jorge Leonardo Gómez Serna, O.P. (1980.10.09 – 1986.03.06), appointed Bishop of Socorro y San Gil
 Prelate of Bertrania en el Catatumbo (Latin Rite), below
 Fr. Juan José Díaz Plata, O.P. (1953.09.13 – 1979.08.02)

See also
Roman Catholicism in Colombia

Sources

External links
 GCatholic.org

Roman Catholic dioceses in Colombia
Roman Catholic Ecclesiastical Province of Nueva Pamplona
Christian organizations established in 1951
Roman Catholic dioceses and prelatures established in the 20th century
1951 establishments in Colombia